Arachnis may refer to:
 Arachnis (moth), a genus of moth
 Arachnis (plant), a genus of orchid
 Arachnis, a ring name of German professional wrestler Achim Albrecht.

See also 
 Arachnid